Mostowlany  is a village in the administrative district of Gmina Gródek, within Białystok County, Podlaskie Voivodeship, in north-eastern Poland, close to the border with Belarus.

Notable people
 Konstanty Kalinowski (known in Belarus as Kastuś Kalinoŭski; 1838–1864) - a writer, journalist, lawyer, one of the leaders of Polish and Belarusian national revival.

References

Villages in Białystok County
Nowogródek Voivodeship (1507–1795)
Grodnensky Uyezd
Białystok Voivodeship (1919–1939)
Belastok Region